Nancy Stewart Parnell (14 May 1901 – 1975) was a British Liberal politician and Trade Unionist who was President of the National Union of Teachers.

Background
Born in London, Parnell was the great-niece of Charles Stewart Parnell.  She grew up in Liverpool, where she attended the Notre Dame High School, and then the University of Liverpool, where she received a scholarship.  While at the university, she became active in support of the League of Nations, also joining the Catholic Women's Suffrage Society and speaking in support of votes for women under the age of thirty.  She served as secretary of Liverpool Students' Union in 1921/22.

Career
After university, Parnell became a school teacher, and joined the National Union of Women Teachers, serving as its president in 1936.  She was active in the Liberal Party and stood as its candidate in Willesden East at the 1935 United Kingdom general election, although she took only 7.3% of the vote and a distant third place.

Much of Parnell's time was devoted to the London Region Federation of the League of Nations Union and in 1936 she became its assistant organiser.  She later became London Regional Officer of its successor, the United Nations Association, retiring in 1960.

References

1901 births
1975 deaths
Alumni of the University of Liverpool
Trade unionists from London
Liberal Party (UK) parliamentary candidates